Gibberula sassenae is a species of sea snail, a marine gastropod mollusk, in the family Cystiscidae. It is named after Dutch-American sociologist Saskia Sassen.

Description
The length of the shell attains 2.39 mm.

Distribution
This marine species occurs off Guadeloupe.

References

sassenae
Gastropods described in 2015